The canton of Oulchy-le-Château is a former administrative division in northern France. It was disbanded following the French canton reorganisation which came into effect in March 2015. It consisted of 26 communes, which joined the canton of Villers-Cotterêts in 2015. It had 5,715 inhabitants (2012).

The canton comprised the following communes:

Ambrief
Arcy-Sainte-Restitue
Beugneux
Billy-sur-Ourcq
Breny
Buzancy
Chacrise
Chaudun
Cramaille
Cuiry-Housse
Droizy
Hartennes-et-Taux
Launoy
Maast-et-Violaine
Montgru-Saint-Hilaire
Muret-et-Crouttes
Nampteuil-sous-Muret
Oulchy-la-Ville
Oulchy-le-Château
Parcy-et-Tigny
Le Plessier-Huleu
Rozières-sur-Crise
Grand-Rozoy
Saint-Rémy-Blanzy
Vierzy
Villemontoire

Demographics

See also
Cantons of the Aisne department

References

Former cantons of Aisne
2015 disestablishments in France
States and territories disestablished in 2015